Gabriel Arturo Garza Hoth also known as "The Black Widower", was a Mexican serial killer active between 1991 and 1998 in Mexico City. He collected life insurance payments on his wife and lovers, gaining a total of 500,000 dollars.

His first victim was his first wife, named Soledad Valdez, who had a heart attack and died in 1991, but the doctors believed that maybe she had been poisoned. His second victim was his girlfriend named Marcela Palacios, who died in 1992 in a "violent assault". The final victim was  Ana Gloria Gomezpalacio who died in another "assault". The coincidences were alerted to the police, but Garza escaped to Spain. He was captured in 1998 and extradited to Mexico, where he was condemned to life in prison.

See also
List of serial killers by country

References

Living people
Male serial killers
Mexican people convicted of murder
Mexican prisoners sentenced to life imprisonment
Mexican serial killers
Murderers for life insurance money
People convicted of murder by Mexico
People extradited from Spain
People extradited to Mexico
Poisoners
Prisoners sentenced to life imprisonment by Mexico
Uxoricides
Year of birth missing (living people)